Charlatan is the debut studio album by American alternative rock band Victorian Halls. The 12-track  album was recorded in Los Angeles in Cameron Webb's recording studio  and released on 16 August 2011 by Victory Records. The vinyl version of Charlatan was released on white-and-green marbled record, with a number of copies featuring an etching on the inner ring of the disc, as an inside joke, of the band professing their producer's love for Justin Bieber. To promote the album, the band issued an interactive e-card  containing a preview of each track from their new record.

The cover art for the album  was painted by Chelsea Greene Lewyta, a freelance avant-garde illustrator living in New York City, US.

Track listing

References

2011 debut albums
Victorian Halls albums
Victory Records albums